The Symphony No. 7 by Peter Maxwell Davies was composed in 2000. It was written for and dedicated to the BBC Philharmonic Orchestra, by whom it was premiered on 19 June 2000 at the St Magnus Festival, in the Pickaquoy Centre, Kirkwall, Orkney, conducted by the composer.

Character and materials
Davies regards this symphony as part of a seven-member cycle, but not as its conclusion. Instead of ending, the Seventh Symphony forms a harmonic link to the opening of the First Symphony. The composer describes the Seventh as his "most classical" symphony, with particular dependence on the music of Joseph Haydn.

Instrumentation
The symphony is scored for piccolo, two flutes (second doubling alto flute), two oboes, cor anglais, two clarinets, bass clarinet, two bassoons, double bassoon, four horns, three trumpets, three trombones, tuba, timpani (a tom-tom or roto-tom may be substituted for the piccolo timp), five percussionists (playing glockenspiel, marimba, crotales, tubular bells, 2 wood blocks (small, medium), tambourine, bubbolo, side drum, 2 bass drums (small, very large), antique cymbals, small suspended Chinese cymbal, clashed cymbals, 2 suspended cymbals (small, large), tam-tam), harp, celesta, and strings.

Analysis
The symphony is in four movements:
 Exposition
 Minuet and Trio
 Slow Movement
 Development

The first movement behaves as the exposition section (only) of a symphonic movement, contrasting two types of musical material, both from each other, and from bridging music with less well-defined characteristics.
 
The second movement, in the classical form of a minuet and trio, was inspired by the op. 20 String Quartets of Haydn, though the musical surface does not sound like the Haydn models.

Although the composer points to the simple, two- and three-part string writing at the beginning of the third, slow movement, as representing the spirit and style of Haydn's middle period, the following build-up and climax has been seen as owing a heavy debt to Gustav Mahler.

The last movement is not a finale, but rather is titled "Development". Its dominant characteristic is that of the traditional development section of a classical symphony: systematic modulation through a succession of tonalities while, at the same time, ideas from earlier in the symphony are fragmented, reassembled, and reworked. After a dramatic accelerando, a quotation from the slow movement arrives, followed by an inconclusive ending that links to the opening of the First Symphony, "so that the whole cycle could start over again".

References

Further reading

External links
 Davies: Symphony No. 7, BBC Philharmonic Orchestra, Peter Maxwell Davies, cond.
 Boosey & Hawkes

2000 compositions
Symphonies by Peter Maxwell Davies
Davies 7
Music dedicated to ensembles or performers